Wickepin is a town in the Wheatbelt region of Western Australia,  south-east of Perth and  east of Narrogin.

History

Wickepin's name is of Aboriginal origin, first recorded in 1881, but the meaning is not known. The area was leased in the early 1870s, but started to grow after the construction of the Great Southern Railway in 1889. The land was opened up by the State Government in 1893, and by 1906 a town had started to develop.

In 1908, plans were announced to extend the railway from Narrogin to Wickepin, and the town was gazetted in June of that year. Seven months later, the Road Board (later Shire Council) was constituted and the railway commenced operations. In the years prior to the First World War Wickepin was an important service centre, featuring three banks, blacksmiths and other businesses as well as a post office and railway buildings.

Albert Facey, Gallipoli veteran and author of A Fortunate Life, lived south of the town from 1922 to 1934 with his family.

From 1917 until 1964, Wickepin hosted an agricultural show in October of each year.

Present day
Wickepin is a service town for the surrounding agricultural district, and contains recreational facilities, historic buildings from its boom period in the 1910s–1920s, a telecentre, public library and caravan park. Albert Facey's house was moved to the main street of Wickepin in 2000 and is open to visitors. Wickepin has a primary school, first opened in 1911, with high school students travelling by school bus to Narrogin.

See also
 Wheatbelt railway lines of Western Australia

References

External links

 Shire of Wickepin

Towns in Western Australia
Wheatbelt (Western Australia)
Grain receival points of Western Australia